Liolaemus yatel is a species of lizard in the family Iguanidae.  It is from Argentina.

References

yatel
Lizards of South America
Reptiles of Argentina
Endemic fauna of Argentina
Reptiles described in 2014
Taxa named by Oscar Aníbal Stellatelli